Newburgh is a village and civil parish located in the Hambleton district of North Yorkshire, England. The population at the 2011 Census was less than 100. Details are maintained in the civil parish of Coxwold.

The village is mainly a large farming community, the main road passing through the village is 'Colley Broach Road'. Newburgh village leads right into Newburgh Grange. The local schools and colleges are about 10 minutes drive away in either Ampleforth, Oulston or Thirsk.

References

Villages in North Yorkshire
Civil parishes in North Yorkshire